The Cookson Hills are in eastern Oklahoma. They are an extension of the Boston Mountains of Arkansas to the east and the southwestern margin of the Ozark Plateau. They lie generally between Stilwell, Sallisaw and Tahlequah. The area became part of the Cherokee Nation in the early 20th century until 1907, when Oklahoma became a state.

History
The Depression-era bank robber Charles Arthur ("Pretty Boy") Floyd was raised in the Cookson Hills.

Geography

The Cooksons are drained by tributaries of the Illinois River (Arkansas). They are heavily wooded, predominantly oak, with patches of black walnut and hickory trees. The J. T. Nickel Family Nature and Wildlife Preserve is located in the Cookson Hills. It is the largest nature preserve in the region.

References

External links
 Cookson Hills Area, TopoQuest
 Encyclopedia of Oklahoma History and Culture - Cookson Hills

Hills of Oklahoma
Landforms of the Ozarks
U.S. Interior Highlands
Landforms of Adair County, Oklahoma
Landforms of Cherokee County, Oklahoma
Landforms of Sequoyah County, Oklahoma